Pande is a village in the Karmala taluka of Solapur district in Maharashtra state, India.

Demographics
Covering  and comprising 615 households at the time of the 2011 census of India, Pande had a population of 2738. There were 1421 males and 1317 females, with 327 people being aged six or younger.

References

Villages in Karmala taluka